Edward Morgan (died 26 April 1642) was a Welsh Roman Catholic priest and martyr. He was declared venerable by Pope Leo XIII in 1886.

Life
Morgan was born at Bettisfield, Hanmer, Flintshire. His father's Christian name was William. Of his mother we know nothing except that one of her kindred was Lieutenant of the Tower of London. From the fact that Morgan was known at St. Omer as John Singleton, Gillow thinks that she was one of the Singletons of Steyning Hall, near Blackpool, in Lancashire.

Of his reported education at Douai College, no evidence appears; but he certainly was a scholar at St. Omer, and at the English College, Rome, Valladolid, and Madrid. For a brief period in 1609 he was a Jesuit novice, having been one of the numerous converts of Father John Bennett, SJ from Salamanca, he was sent on the English mission in 1621.

Martyrdom 
 
He seems to have gone to Wales, and in April, 1629, was in prison in Flintshire, for refusing the oath of allegiance. Later about 1632 he was condemned in the Star Chamber to have his ears nailed to the pillory for having accused certain judges of treason. Immediately afterwards he was committed to the Fleet Prison in London, where he remained until a few days before his death on 26 April.

He was condemned at the Old Bailey for being a priest under the provisions of 27 Eliz., c. 2 on St. George's Day, 23 April 1642. At the same time was condemned John Francis Quashet, a Scots Minim, who subsequently died in Newgate Prison.  Morgan was executed at Tyburn, London. A letter purporting to be Morgan's last, written at Newgate prison on 23 April and addressed to the King and Parliament, was published in London on the 29th.

Legacy 
Venerable Edward Morgan Catholic Primary School in Wales is named after him.

References

Attribution
 The entry cites:
Richard Challoner, Memoirs of Missionary Priests, II (Manchester, 1803), 110
Joseph Gillow, Bibl. Dict. Eng. Cath., s. v.
John Hungerford Pollen, Acts of English Martyrs (London, 1891), 343
Calendar State Papers Domestic 1628 -29; 1631-33 (London, 1859–1862), passim

1642 deaths
17th-century Welsh Roman Catholic priests
Martyred Roman Catholic priests
17th-century Roman Catholic martyrs
Year of birth unknown
Executed Roman Catholic priests
Venerable martyrs of England and Wales